The Wizard of Venus is a science fiction novella by American writer Edgar Rice Burroughs, as well as the title of a collection in which it was later published together with an unrelated story. "The Wizard of Venus" is the final story in Burroughs's Venus series (sometimes called the "Carson Napier of Venus series"). Written in 1941, the piece remained unpublished until 1964, fourteen years after the author's death. Burroughs intended it to be the opening piece in a sequence of stories to be brought together later in book form, as he had done in the instance of the previous Venus volume, Escape on Venus. He began the first follow-up tale, only to abandon the project in the wake of the Japanese attack on Pearl Harbor; the text of the aborted sequel is now lost.

"The Wizard of Venus" was first published in the 1964 Burroughs collection Tales of Three Planets together with the unrelated tales "The Resurrection of Jimber-Jaw", "Beyond the Farthest Star" and "Tangor Returns". Afterwards it appeared in the collection The Wizard of Venus (Ace Books, August 1970). This also included the unrelated pirate adventure "Pirate Blood." A subsequent British edition (New English Library, 1975) omitted the unrelated story.

Plot summary
"The Wizard of Venus". Carson Napier is trapped in the castle of an insane Venusian "wizard" who holds the local population in thrall through the use of hypnotic powers. Napier, who is possessed of comparable powers he has hitherto utilized solely to transmit his account of his Venusian adventures back to Earth, successfully counters the tyrant and frees his victims.

"Pirate Blood". Johnny LaFitte of Glenora, California, a 20th-century descendant of the New Orleans pirate Jean Lafitte, finds himself thrown by a bizarre set of events into his ancestor's profession. The author's depiction of modern-day piracy is replete with cold-blooded murder and rapine, but overall the tale is a semi-serious takeoff on the theory that heredity equals destiny.

References

External links
 
ERBzine.com Illustrated Edgar Rice Burroughs Bibliography for Wizard of Venus
ERBzine.com Illustrated Edgar Rice Burroughs Bibliography for Pirate Blood
Edgar Rice Burroughs Summary Project page for Wizard of Venus

1964 fantasy novels
1964 science fiction novels
1964 American novels
Ace Books books
American fantasy novels
American science fiction novels
Fantasy short story collections
Science fiction short story collections
Venus novels by Edgar Rice Burroughs